The 2018–19 Women's CEV Cup was the 47th edition of the European CEV Cup volleyball club tournament, the former "Top Teams Cup".

Format
The tournament is played on a knockout format, with 27 teams participating. Initially 20 teams were allocated direct vacancies to enter the competition, with another 7 teams joining the competition via Champions League qualification. On 29 June 2018, a drawing of lots in Luxembourg City, Luxembourg, determined the team's pairing for each match. Each team plays a home and an away match with result points awarded for each leg (3 points for 3–0 or 3–1 wins, 2 points for 3–2 win, 1 point for 2–3 loss). After two legs, the team with the most result points advances to the next round. The Golden Set winner is the team that first obtains 15 points, provided that the points difference between the two teams is at least 2 points (thus, the Golden Set is similar to a tiebreak set in a normal match).

Participating teams
Drawing of lots for the 27 participating team was held in Luxembourg City, Luxembourg on 29 June 2018.
20 teams allocated vacancies spots and 7 teams qualified as Champions League qualification losers.

The number of participants on the basis of ranking list for European Cup Competitions:

Main phase

16th Finals

|}

First leg

|}

Second leg

|}

8th Finals

|}

First leg

|}

Second leg

|}

4th Finals

|}

First leg

|}

Second leg

|}

Final phase

Semifinals

|}

First leg

|}

Second leg

|}

Finals

|}

First leg

|}

Second leg

|}

References

External links
 2019 CEV Volleyball Cup - Women

Women's CEV Cup
CEV Cup
CEV Cup